The 2021–22 season was the 124th season in the existence of Royale Union Saint-Gilloise and the club's first season back in the top flight of Belgian football since the 1973. In addition to the domestic league, Royale Union Saint-Gilloise also participated in this season's edition of the Belgian Cup, where they reached the sixth round, being knocked out by KV Mechelen.

Players

First-team squad

Out on loan

Transfers

In

Out

Pre-season and friendlies

Competitions

Overall record

First Division A

League table

Results summary

Results by round

Matches
The league fixtures were announced on 8 June 2021.

Play-Off I

Results summary

Results by round

Matches

Belgian Cup

Statistics

Squad appearances and goals
Last updated on 22 May 2022

|-
! colspan=14 style=background:#dcdcdc; text-align:center|Goalkeepers

|-
! colspan=14 style=background:#dcdcdc; text-align:center|Defenders

|-
! colspan=14 style=background:#dcdcdc; text-align:center|Midfielders

|-
! colspan=14 style=background:#dcdcdc; text-align:center|Forwards

|-
! colspan=14 style=background:#dcdcdc; text-align:center|Players who have made an appearance this season but have left the club

|}

Goalscorers

Clean sheets

References

Royale Union Saint-Gilloise seasons
Union Saint-Gilloise